The following are the dams and reservoirs located in Telangana. Telangana is known as the Land of Dams, Reservoirs, Lakes, Tanks and Canals and has the most number of Dams, Reservoirs, Lakes, Tanks and Canals than any other South Indian state. Telangana Irrigation is going to be face lifted with new Key projects under construction such as  Kaleshwaram Project, Palamuru Rangareddy, Sitarama Lift Irrigation, TupakulaGudem, Kalwakurthy Projects.

List of Major Irrigation dams and reservoirs in Telangana

List of Major Lift Irrigation Schemes In Telangana 

Existing & Proposed Lift Irrigation Schemes:

References

 
Telangana

Dams